Camp de la Paix ("Peace Camp"), also called Abu Dhabi Base and known and referred to by the French military as Implantation militaire française aux Émirats arabes unis ("French Military Settlement in UAE") or simply IMFEAU, is a French Naval Air Station based in Abu Dhabi, in the United Arab Emirates, since 2009.

History 
Defence arrangements were signed between the UAE and France in January 1995, but it was not until 2007 that the UAE requested a French military presence within the country.  This plan was formally announced in January 2008, and the base itself was inaugurated on 26 May 2009 by French President Nicolas Sarkozy.

Organisation 
Abu Dhabi base comprises three military camps of the French Army that harbour around 250 personnel.

The base operates under ALINDIEN, the Admiral who heads the French forces in the Indian Ocean. Its operation costs, amounting to 15 to 50 million Euros, are funded by the UAE.

Naval base 
The naval base is located in Port Zayed, at the end of the commerce harbour. It comprises a 300-metre long dock with a 200-metre wide area, and can host ships up to 10 metres of draught. This allows docking of all French Navy ships, save for the French aircraft carrier Charles de Gaulle. The base faces the Straits of Hormuz, a position of vital economic importance. Approximately 40% of the world's oil passes through the Hormusz Strait. The naval component of the base will have 72 staff members. It will accommodate boat stops in the region and will serve as "the preferred support ships of the Navy in the region".

Air base 

The air component is named "Air base 104 Al Dhafra". Since 1 October 2008, three fighters have been based there. The base parcel granted to the French Air Force can harbour up to six aircraft. The land base has 3 Mirage 2000-5 jet fighters currently on station in addition to 57 members of the military on staff.

Land base 
A training camp was opened for the French Army, 50 km from Abu Dhabi. It is equipped to train soldiers for urban and desert operations. The land portion of the base holds 93 soldiers within. The soldiers tasked with maintaining the land portion of the base "will have the task to ensure the missions of education and training for fighting in urban areas and in the desert". In 2011, the 13th Demi-Brigade of the Foreign Legion moved from Djibouti to the base and was in turn replaced there by the 5th Cuirassier Regiment in 2016.

See also 
 Al Dhafra Air Base
 Paris-Sorbonne University Abu Dhabi

Notes

References 

 Ennahar Online - A French military base in Abu Dhabi

Military installations of France in other countries
Buildings and structures in Abu Dhabi
France–United Arab Emirates relations